Year 1111 (MCXI) was a common year starting on Sunday (link will display the full calendar) of the Julian calendar.

Events 
 By place 

 Levant 
 Battle of Shaizar: Sultan Muhammad I (Tapar) appoints Mawdud ibn Altuntash, Turkic governor (atabeg) of Mosul, to lead a Seljuk expedition against the Crusaders. The composite force includes Muslim contingents from Damascus, Diyarbakır, Ahlat and some Persian troops, headed by Bursuq ibn Bursuq from Hamadan. The Crusaders (16,000 men), led by King Baldwin I of Jerusalem, are cut off from their supplies, and within two weeks (due to constant Seljuk skirmishes) forced to fall back on Afamiya in northern Syria.
 Winter – The Crusaders, led by Baldwin I, besiege Tyre, without a supporting fleet. While besieging the town, a Byzantine embassy arrives in the Crusader camp. The Byzantines try to persuade Baldwin to join a coalition against Tancred, Italo-Norman prince of Galilee, but he refuses.

 Europe 
 April 13 – Henry V is crowned as Holy Roman Emperor by Pope Paschal II. Henry returns to Germany, where he strengthens his power by granting privileges to the German nobles of the region of the Upper Rhine.
 Almoravid forces under Syr ibn Abi Bakr capture Santarém and Sintra. The efforts of the Berbers to reconquer lost ground lead to the sack of Coimbra. The same year the city revolts against their lord in Portugal.
 The commune of Lodi Vecchio (known as Laus Pompeia) is besieged and destroyed by Milanese troops in northern Italy.
 October 5 – The 18-year-old Baldwin VII succeeds his father, Robert II, as Count of Flanders until 1119.

 Ireland 
 Domnall Ua Briain becomes king of the Hebrides and the Isle of Man, following a request from the people of the kingdom of Munster, to send them a ruler.

 Asia 
 The Donglin Academy, a Chinese educational institution, is established in Wuxi during the Northern Song Dynasty.

 By topic 

 Religion 
 The Synod of Rathbreasail marks the transition of the Irish church, from a monastic to a diocesan structure.

Births 
 Afonso I (the Conqueror), King of Portugal (d. 1185)
 Agnes of Babenberg, High Duchess of Poland (d. 1163)
 Andrei Bogolyubsky, Prince of Vladimir-Suzdal (d. 1174)
 Henry II, Duke of Limburg (House of Ardenne) (d. 1167)
 Josceline de Bohon, bishop of Salisbury (d. 1184)
 Stephen of Armenia, Armenian nobleman (d. 1165)

Deaths 
 January 29 – Piotr I (or Peter), bishop of Wrocław
 February 22 – Roger Borsa, Italo-Norman nobleman
 March 3 – Bohemond I, Italo-Norman nobleman (b. 1054)
 April 12 – Berthold II, German nobleman (b. 1050)
 April 17 – Robert of Molesme, French abbot (b. 1028)
 June 15 – Yun Gwan, Korean general (b. 1040)
 September 27 – Vekenega, Croatian abbess
 October 5 – Robert II, Count of Flanders (b. 1065)
 October 7 – Anna Polovetskaya, Kievan princess
 October 26 – Gómez González, Castilian nobleman
 November 8 – Otto II, German nobleman
 December 19 
 Agnes of Rheinfelden, German noblewoman
 Al-Ghazali, Persian theologian (b. 1058)
 Cadwgan ap Bleddyn, Prince of Powys (b. 1051)
 Iorwerth ap Bleddyn, Prince of Powys (b. 1053)
 Ōe no Masafusa, Japanese poet and writer (b. 1041)
 Richard II, Italian consul and Duke of Gaeta

References